Giacomo Sagripanti is an Italian conductor.

Sagripanti was born in Abruzzo, and his parents come from a town near Ancona.

In 2013, he made his US debut, conducting La Cenerentola with Seattle Opera.

In 2016, Sagripanti won "Young Conductor of the Year" at the International Opera Awards.

Sagripanti has conducted the Opéra Bastille in Paris, the Philharmonic Orchestra of St. Petersburg, Glyndebourne Opera, Deutsche Oper Berlin and Opéra de Monaco.

He is married to Czech soprano, Zuzana Marková, and lives in Montegiorgio, Italy.

References

Living people
Italian male conductors (music)
People from Abruzzo
21st-century Italian conductors (music)
21st-century Italian male musicians
Year of birth missing (living people)